{{DISPLAYTITLE:4-Fluoro-L-threonine}}

4-Fluoro--threonine is an antibacterial produced by Streptomyces cattleya. It is formed by the fluorothreonine transaldolase catalysed transfer of fluoroacetaldehyde onto threonine.

References

Fluorinated amino acids
Fluorohydrins
Fluorine-containing natural products